Adl is an Iranian newspaper in Fars Province. The concessionaire of this newspaper was Mohammadsadegh Sharif known as Setoodeh and it was published in Shiraz since 1915.

See also
List of magazines and newspapers of Fars

References

1915 establishments in Iran
Mass media in Shiraz
Persian-language newspapers
Publications established in 1915